Triathlon for the 2017 Island Games was held at the Kallbadhuset, Visby, Gotland, Sweden in June 2017.

Medal table

Results

External links
 Regulations

References

2017 in triathlon
2017
Triathlon